Tambinia is a genus of planthoppers (Hemiptera) in the family Tropiduchidae and typical of the tribe Tambiniini (erected by Kirkaldy in 1907); species are found in Australia and Southeast Asia.

Description  
These are small insects, body length less than 10 mm. Width of head rounded in front (through eyes) less than width of Pronotum. Forehead and mesonotum with three carinae and the ocelli are very small.  The hind tibiae have three spines.

Taxonomy
In a 1982 revision (Fennah, 1982) Tambinia was included in the tribe Tambiniini, along with the genera: Athestia, Biruga, Garumna, Garumnella, Kallitambinia, Kallitaxila, Lanshu, Neotaxilanoides, Nesotaxila, Ossoides, Sumbana and Tauropola.  Tambinia is most similar to Nesotaxila, Kallitaxila and Kallitambinia

Species
The genus Tambinia was established in Carl Stål in 1859 for three species from Sri Lanka: Tambinia languida Stål, Tambinia debilis Stål and Tambinia rufoornata Stål.  Fulgoromorpha Lists on the Web currently lists:
 Tambinia atrosignata Distant, 1906 — Sri Lanka
 Tambinia bambusana Chang & Chen, 2012
 Tambinia bizonata Matsumura 1914 — Japan, Taiwan
 Tambinia capitata Distant, 1906 
 Tambinia conus Wang & Liang, 2011 — New Guinea 
 Tambinia debilis Stål, 1859 — Sri Lanka 
 Tambinia exoleta Melichar, 1914 
 Tambinia fasciculosa Melichar, 1914 
 Tambinia guamensis Metcalf, 1946
 Tambinia inconspicua Distant, 1906 
 Tambinia languida Stål, 1859 — Sri Lanka - type species
 Tambinia macula Wang & Liang, 2011 — Malaysia: Borneo 
 Tambinia menglunensis Men and Qin in Men, Qin and Liu, 2009 
 Tambinia pitho Fennah, 1970
 Tambinia robustocarina Wang & Liang, 2011 — Malaysia: Sabah 
 Tambinia rubrolineata Liang in Liang and Jiang, 2003
 Tambinia rubromaculata Distant, 1916 — Sri Lanka
 Tambinia rufoornata Stål, 1859 — Sri Lanka 
 Tambinia sexmaculata Wang & Liang, 2011 — Australia: Kuranda 
 Tambinia similis Liang in Liang and Jiang, 2003 - southern China, Vietnam
 Tambinia sinuata Men & Qin, 2012
 Tambinia sisyphus Fennah, 1956 
 Tambinia theivora Fennah, 1982
 Tambinia venusta (Kirkaldy, 1906)
 Tambinia verticalis Distant, 1916
 Tambinia zonata Muir, 1931

References

External links 

 

Tropiduchinae
Hemiptera of Asia